"Top of the World" is a song recorded by American country music artist Tim McGraw.  It was released to radio on August 4, 2015 as the lead single to his third studio album for Big Machine Records, Damn Country Music, released on November 6, 2015, and his fourteenth overall single for Big Machine. The song was written by Josh Osborne, Jimmy Robbins and Jon Nite.

Critical reception
An uncredited Taste of Country review stated that "Tim McGraw keeps it mellow with the first single from an upcoming project. “Top of the World” is a gentle way for the singer to describe his love to someone. McGraw uses a familiar metaphor to make it clear this woman couldn’t make him feel any finer."

Music video
The music video was directed by McGraw Music and premiered in November 2015.

Commercial performance
The song debuted on the Country Airplay chart at No. 30 and the Hot Country Songs chart at No. 35 upon its release.  The following week it debuted on the Country Digital Songs chart at No. 18, selling 16,000 copies.

Charts

Weekly charts

Year-end charts

References

2015 songs
2015 singles
Tim McGraw songs
Big Machine Records singles
Songs written by Jimmy Robbins
Songs written by Josh Osborne
Songs written by Jon Nite
Song recordings produced by Byron Gallimore
Song recordings produced by Tim McGraw